Gillian Dainty (married name Green) (born 1958), is a female former athlete who competed for England.

Athletics career
Dainty was a three times National champion after winning the 1980, 1981 and 1983 AAA National Championships in the 1,500 metres.

She represented England and won a silver medal in the 1,500 metres, at the 1982 Commonwealth Games in Brisbane, Queensland, Australia. Four years later she represented England in the 1,500 metres event again, at the 1986 Commonwealth Games in Edinburgh, Scotland.

References

1958 births
English female middle-distance runners
Athletes (track and field) at the 1982 Commonwealth Games
Athletes (track and field) at the 1986 Commonwealth Games
Commonwealth Games medallists in athletics
Commonwealth Games silver medallists for England
Living people
Medallists at the 1982 Commonwealth Games